Puncturella billsae is a species of sea snail, a marine gastropod mollusk in the family Fissurellidae, the keyhole limpets.

Description
The size of the shell reaches 3.5 mm.

Distribution
This species occurs in the Gulf of Mexico, in the Caribbean Sea (off Cuba) and in the Atlantic Ocean off Brazil

References

 Turgeon, D.; Quinn, J.F.; Bogan, A.E.; Coan, E.V.; Hochberg, F.G.; Lyons, W.G.; Mikkelsen, P.M.; Neves, R.J.; Roper, C.F.E.; Rosenberg, G.; Roth, B.; Scheltema, A.; Thompson, F.G.; Vecchione, M.; Williams, J.D. (1998). Common and scientific names of aquatic invertebrates from the United States and Canada: mollusks. 2nd ed. American Fisheries Society Special Publication, 26. American Fisheries Society: Bethesda, MD (USA). . IX, 526 + cd-rom pp

External links
 
 Pérez Farfante, I. (1947). The genera Zeidora, Nesta, Emarginula, Rimula and Puncturella in the western Atlantic. Johnsonia. 2: 93-148

Fissurellidae
Gastropods described in 1947